Gong Maoxin and Zhang Ze were the defending champions but lost in the quarterfinals to Arjun Kadhe and Saketh Myneni.

Kadhe and Myneni won the title after defeating Nam Ji-sung and Song Min-kyu 6–3, 0–6, [10–6] in the final.

Seeds

Draw

References

External links
 Main draw

Chengdu Challenger - Doubles
2019 Doubles